The British Rail Class 20, otherwise known as an English Electric Type 1, is a class of diesel-electric locomotive.  In total, 228 locomotives in the class were built by English Electric between 1957 and 1968, the large number being in part because of the failure of other early designs in the same power range to provide reliable locomotives.

The locomotives were originally numbered D8000–D8199 and D8300–D8327. They are known by railway enthusiasts as "Choppers".

Overview 
Designed to work light mixed freight traffic, they have no train heating facilities. Locomotives up to D8127 were fitted with disc indicators in the style of the steam era; when headcodes were introduced in 1960 the locomotive’s design was changed to incorporate headcode boxes. Although older locomotives were not retro-fitted with headcode boxes, a few of the earlier batch acquired headcode boxes as a result of repairs. Unusually for British designs, the locomotive had a single cab. This caused serious problems with visibility when travelling nose first, though in these circumstances the driver's view is comparable to that on the steam locomotives that the Class 20s replaced. It was common, however, to find Class 20s paired together at the nose, with their cabs at opposite ends, ensuring that the driver could quite clearly see the road ahead, and a guard can watch the train from the other locomotive without the need for a brakevan.

The Class 20 saw only limited service on passenger trains. A small number were fitted with a through pipe for steam heating, primarily for use in conjunction with a Class 27 locomotive on the West Highland Line. Otherwise their use was limited to summer relief services, particularly to Skegness often under the adopted title of The Jolly Fisherman starting from various places including Burton-on-Trent, Stoke-on-Trent, Derby and Leicester. Also occasionally other holiday resorts on the east coast of England, occasional duties as a pilot, and short distance diversions of electric-hauled trains over non-electrified lines.

The shift of light mixed freight to the road network left British Rail with an oversupply of small locomotives. The Class 20s, however, could work in multiple and so handle heavier traffic. Most spent the majority of their working lives coupled nose to nose in pairs to provide a more useful  unit and to solve the visibility problems.

Most have now been withdrawn but a few remain with GBRf and other minor and industrial operators. Several that are usually operated singly have been fitted with nose-mounted video cameras as a way of solving the visibility problems.

The Série 1400 locomotives of Portuguese Railways (CP) are based on the BR Class 20s.

Operation

British Rail 

The first batch of Class 20s were allocated to Devons Road depot in Bow, London to work cross-London transfer freights, with the following eight locos allocated to Hornsey depot. After a trial with D8006, D8028–D8034 were allocated for work in highland Scotland, and had tablet catcher recesses built into the cabsides. D8035–D8044 were originally to be allocated to Norwich, but were actually used for empty coaching stock (ECS) workings in and out of London Euston. D8050–D8069 were allocated to the new Tinsley TMD in South Yorkshire, from where they regularly worked into Lincolnshire and East Yorkshire. D8070–D8127 were sent to operate in the Scottish Lowlands, particularly in the Forth-Clyde area, and the Fife coalfield. This completed the original orders for 128 locos, the last being delivered in August 1962.

With the subsequent order for a further 100 Class 20 locos, deliveries recommenced with D8128 in January 1966. Tests in 1967 using D8179 and D8317 resulted in locos from D8316 being delivered from the manufacturer with the new electronic control system for working merry-go-round (MGR) coal trains. Trains to Longannet Power Station sometimes required locos to triple-head trains.

After privatisation 
Some Class 20s were used on the construction of the Channel Tunnel and High Speed 1 and some even made their way to France to work for the Compagnie des chemins de Fer Départementaux (CFD) in industry there, although these have since been repatriated. Some locos have in the past been hired by Hunslet-Barclay to provide motive power for weedkilling trains.

The fleet of Class 20/3s owned by Direct Rail Services (DRS) has at times seen frequent work across Britain in pairs (or with Class 37s) on nuclear flask trains, the company's speciality. DRS supplies class 20s for use with the Rail Head Treatment Train in winter.
Perhaps the most unusual train hauled by a Class 20 was the Kosovo Train for Life charter train in autumn 1999 which carried 800 tonnes of aid. Leaving London's Kensington Olympia station on 17 September 1999, the train was hauled by 20 901, 20 902 and 20 903 throughout, reaching Prague by 20 September and arriving at Pristina station at 10:00 on 25 September.

DRS initially had a fleet of 15 operational Class 20/3 locomotives. Three of these have subsequently been disposed of for scrap, after stripping for spares; a further two have been sold on to Harry Needle Railroad Company (HNRC). Following the end of the 2019 Sandite season (Rail Head Treatment Trains), all of the remaining DRS Class 20/3 fleet were stood down, awaiting disposal.

In 2005 HNRC acquired a large number of 20/0s and 20/9s from the stored DRS fleet. By May 2008 HNRC had eight operational Class 20s and sixteen in storage; two were on hire at Corus Scunthorpe (nos. 81 and 82).

Over a ten-year period, concluding in 2019, a number of class 20s from HNRC were employed to deliver new S-Stock from Bombardier Transportation at Derby Litchurch Lane Works, to London Underground at Neasden depot or West Ruislip depot, for commissioning. Subsequently, immediately after the completion of deliveries, modification of these units (addition of equipment for automatic signalling) was required and they were returned to Derby in the same manner. Formation of the trains usually consisted of a pair of Class 20s, two barrier wagons, the LU S-Stock set, two barrier wagons and a dead-in-tow pair of Class 20s at the rear.

Sub-classes

Liveries

British Rail 
D8000 was delivered in June 1957 in overall green livery, with grey footplate, red bufferbeams and a grey roof extending down the bodyside to the edge of the roof panels. The original batch of 10 locos bore the BR crest facing towards the nose on both sides, used yellow sans serif numerals, and had green cab roofs; locos from D8010 had the correct pattern BR crest, white numerals and grey cab roof. This was adjusted after D8103 to include a small yellow warning panel, although the precise size and detail of such panels varied somewhat.

In 1966, D8048 was selected by the BR design panel for livery experiments and was painted in the prototype standard blue, including the bufferbeams and roof. The exceptions were the full yellow front ends and a black underframe. After the adoption of Rail Blue as the BR livery, D8178 became one of the first locomotives to be delivered in this livery (along with Class 25 D7660 and Class 47 D1953) and all subsequent locomotives were delivered in this livery. Despite this, some locos continued to be returned to traffic in green livery, although often with the later BR "double arrow" logo and data panel; thus 20 141 was the final main line loco to carry BR green livery.

Some locomotives, including 20 227, were repainted in the Railfreight grey livery with red sole bars, yellow ends and large double arrows on the sides.

At least four of the class were painted in the British Rail Telecommunications livery:
 20 075 – Sir William Cooke – rebuilt as 20 309 and currently stood down by DRS, awaiting disposal
 20 128 – Guglielmo Marconi – rebuilt as 20 307 and has been scrapped
 20 131 – Almon B. Strowger – rebuilt as 20 306 and has been scrapped
 20 187 – Sir Charles Wheatstone – rebuilt as 20 308 and currently stood down by DRS, awaiting disposal

Privatisation 

Class 20/3 locomotives operated by DRS have all been painted in DRS Oxford Blue livery, with red bufferbeams and full yellow ends. There have been small variations in the shade of yellow used on these locos, and the penetration of blue from the sides onto the ends.

Class 20 locomotives operated by the Harry Needle Railroad Company (HNRC) are painted into house colours of orange and black, with yellow nose ends (20 121, 20 166, 20 311 and 20 314). Some other locomotives owned by HNRC, of subclasses 20/0 and 20/9, have been painted in a variation of two-tone Railfreight grey livery. These have dark grey roof, mid-grey upper body and light grey lower body, black underframe and buffer beam. The nose ends are painted yellow, with the lower part of the cab end in yellow and the upper part black, this continuing around the cab sides but with the light grey instead of yellow. Others are in BR Blue or Railfreight Red-stripe livery. HNRC Class 20s on long-term hire to Corus were painted in Corus livery; previously silver but currently a bright yellow with red solebar (No.81 – 20 056). Since the Corus business was bought by the Indian Tata Steel group, some of these locomotives have been repainted into Tata Blue livery (No.82 – 20 066). Two HNRC Class 20s have been painted into GBRf Europorte's blue and gold livery (20 901 and 20 905), while two other HNRC Class 20s have been painted in the White livery of Hope Construction Materials (now Breedon Cement), with a black solebar (No.2 – 20 168) and a white solebar (No.3 – 20 906).

Four locomotives carried the orange and white livery of the CFD (Compagnie de Chemins de Fer Départementaux) whilst working in France, these were 20 035, 20 063, 20 139 and 20 228.

Two locomotives, numbers 20 142 and 20 189, were briefly (for a matter of months during 2013) painted into a Balfour Beatty blue and white livery but were then returned to a variation of BR blue.

The last built class 20, number 20 227, has been used extensively on the London Underground network.  In the mid-2000s it was painted in Metropolitan maroon livery and named "Sir John Betjeman" by the Class 20 Locomotive Society as acknowledgement of this work. It was repainted in a special 'modern taste' LUL-based livery, to mark the London Underground 150 celebrations but has now been repainted, again into Metropolitan maroon, but this time lined, and renamed "Sherlock Holmes".  The "Sir John Betjeman" name is now carried by 20 142, which also sports Metropolitan line maroon livery.

Mainline registered class 20s are:

Accidents and incidents
 On 16 December 1971, locomotives D8142 and D8115 collided with Class 25 no. D7605 at Lenton South Junction, Nottingham, killing 3 railwaymen.
 On 18 May 1989, locomotives 20 134 and 20 131 collided with the rear of an MGR train at Worksop, killing the driver.
Five passengers on the heritage railway service were injured.

In popular culture 
In the 1995 James Bond film GoldenEye, 20 188 was used as the locomotive of an escape train on the Nene Valley Railway, with the addition of armour plating to give the impression of a Russian armoured locomotive.

Preservation 
22 English-Electric Type 1 Class 20s are preserved, including the first of the class built, D8000, which is part of the National Railway Collection at the National Railway Museum in York, North Yorkshire.

A further three engines were preserved but later used for spares, then eventually scrapped. 20 035 was stripped of parts for use on fellow Gloucestershire Warwickshire Railway based classmate D8137, and later scrapped at EMR Kingsbury. 20 177 was located at the Severn Valley Railway and became a source of spare parts for D8188 & D8059; with the remains first going to C.F. Booth Ltd., Rotherham and then the cab section to The Cab Yard in south Wales.  20206 was operated on the Mid-Norfolk Railway, but later sold by its owner, stripped of parts and scrapped.

Model railways 
Meccano Ltd announced 00-scale models of the Class 20 locomotive in December 1958's edition of the Meccano Magazine. Both 2-rail and 3-rail versions were produced. Mass-produced models probably became generally available in 1959. It was Hornby-Dublo's first model railway locomotive with a moulded plastic body.

In 2008 Hornby Railways launched its first version of the BR Class 20 in OO gauge. Since 2016 Hornby have produced a basic representation of the prototype as part of their Railroad range in BR Blue.

In May 2021 Bachmann Collectors Club announced a limited edition run of two London Transport models of the class 20, No. 20142 Sir John Betjeman and No. 20227 Sherlock Holmes. The models are produced in conjunction with the London Transport Museum,

Notes

References

General references

Further reading

External links 

 BRT Locos

20
Bo-Bo locomotives
English Electric locomotives
Vulcan Foundry locomotives
Robert Stephenson and Hawthorns locomotives
Railway locomotives introduced in 1957
Standard gauge locomotives of Great Britain
Standard gauge locomotives of France
Diesel-electric locomotives of France
Diesel-electric locomotives of Great Britain